Durham Energy Institute (DEI) is a research institute located within Durham University. It was launched in September 2009 for research in the fields of energy technology and society. The current Executive Director is Professor Jon Gluyas.

The principal aim of the DEI is to find solutions for societal aspects of energy use and so
 olve technological and social problems associated witdemand  ovisio. and use.

Research
The DEI has expertise in a number of energy technology areas:

 Fundamental science into cheaper more efficient energy materials
 Developing future energy generation technologies such as hydrogen and nuclear fusion
 Designing energy systems which are more smart, flexible, people-centred and sustainable
 Understanding the social, economic and political processes which shape the energy world so we can build a brighter future.

Biofuels
Biofuels covers a range of technologies, either where biological material is readily converted to an energy source, or living organisms produce a fuel source. The DEI undertakes research on Microalgae biofuels, Cellulosic Crops and aspects related to intellectual property and the social pressures on biofuel policy.

Photovoltaics
The DEI undertakes photovoltaics research (PV) on the fundamental science that underpins both organic and inorganic PV devices right through to their design, manufacturing and deployment. Key areas are: organic PV, inorganic PV, hybrid organic-inorganic structures and the underpinning systems required to successfully deploy PV.

Energy generation, transmission and distribution
Includes wind, wave, hydro, microgeneration, smart grids, and grid integration of renewables.

Geo-energy
Includes the exploitation of fossil fuels and shale gas, carbon capture and storage and geothermal energy.  The Centre for Research into Earth Energy Systems (CeREES) is an important contributor to research in this area.

Energy and Society
Energy and society research at the DEI is committed to developing pragmatic solutions to contemporary energy issues, including renewable energy, energy distribution, geopolitical security and climate change. The Society and Energy Research Cluster at DEI is fundamentally interdisciplinary, drawing on the expertise of a wide range of social and physical science disciplines across the University. The ambition of the cluster is to develop new theoretical approaches to current energy research challenges based on the conception of energy systems as socio-technical.

Economics, Regulation, and Policy
Includes resource management and pricing, technological change and innovation, carbon finance, economics of renewables, environmental impacts, consumer behaviour.

Technologies for fusion energy
Pragmatic low-carbon solutions to the UK energy challenges will inevitably include nuclear energy. Fusion energy provides an alternative nuclear route. It is a demanding technology that includes holding a plasma burning at 100 million degrees. However the fuel is derived from seawater (i.e. essentially limitless), the levels of toxic materials are very much less than produced using fission because of the short lifetimes of the materials involved and fusion technology is not a weapons technology. Work at Durham includes the Superconductivity Group, the Centre for Advanced Instrumentation Group, and the European Reference Laboratory.

Its board of advisors includes Ian Burdon, Benj Sykes DONG Energy, John Loughhead UKERC, Helen Moss IBM and Andrew Mill Narec.

Durham Centre for Doctoral Training in Energy (CDT in Energy)
The Durham CDT in Energy forms an important and integral part of the DEI, offering an interdisciplinary postgraduate research training programme in energy.

MSc Energy and Society
The MSc Energy and Society is led by Durham University's Anthropology Department, in association with the Durham Energy Institute and its partner departments (including Engineering, Social Sciences and Humanities). Unique among Masters programmes, the course emphasizes the insights that the social sciences can offer to energy and development, and vice versa.

See also
Renewable energy
Biofuels
Carbon finance
Energy and society
Fracking
Geothermal power
Hydro power
Microgeneration
Shale Gas
Smart grid

References

External links
 Durham Energy Institute

Research institutes in County Durham
Durham University